The Kid from the Big Apple is a 2015 Malaysian film. The film stars Sarah Tan as Sarah, an 11-year-old girl from New York City who was forced to move to rural Malaysia to stay with her grandfather. The film garnered several awards at the 7th Macau International Movie Festival and the 28th Malaysian Film Festival.

Plot
Sarah reluctantly moved to Malaysia to stay with a grandfather whom she had never met before as her mother had to visit China to resolve work-related problems. Initially, Sarah refused to adapt to her grandfather's traditional cultural practice, such as eating chicken feet for breakfast, and the local community who she thought were disgusting. Despite the best efforts of her grandfather to re-create a familiar environment for Sarah by recreating western dishes that Sarah is familiar with using local substitutes, Sarah only ate potato chips that she brought over from New York and refused to communicate with her grandfather.

Defeated, Sarah's grandfather turned to Ah Bao, a neighbour who claims to speak English, to translate his instructions in Chinese and Cantonese to Sarah. Annoyed but later amused at his poor command of English, Sarah starts to take an interest in the surrounding neighbourhood. She also reveals that she can actually understand and speak Chinese, much to her grandfather's relief. Slowly, she starts interacting with the children around the neighbourhood, who included her in their activities, and starts adapting to the local environment. She also began to interact with her grandfather and a bond starts to form between them.

Between the scenes of interactions between Sarah and her grandfather, there were also flashbacks that revealed the strained relationship between Sarah's mother and grandfather. It was revealed that Sarah's mother, unmarried and pregnant with Sarah, had a strong argument with her father (Sarah's grandfather) who was strongly against her moving to New York City to live with her boyfriend. She disregarded his advice and ran away from home, never contacting him until asking if Sarah can stay with him, while pursuing a career as a fashion designer whilst balancing her role of a single mother after Sarah's father abandoned her.

Over time, the bond between Sarah and her grandfather deepened, despite occasional tension created by differences between her contemporary, social media-influenced lifestyle and her grandfather's conservative values. Sarah had warmed to the community so much that as the time draws closer to her departure, she became reluctant to leave. Above all, she did not want to leave her grandfather alone, as she had learnt of his various health ailments that he had hid from everyone over the years. Sarah thus prodded her grandfather to embrace new media so that she could communicate with him overseas and also tried desperately to get her mother and grandfather to reconcile.

Before Sarah's departure, Sarah's grandfather got Ah Bao to film a video to give to Sarah's mother when he dies. Inside, he apologised for not being a good father, his admiration for raising Sarah single-handedly as well as him bequeathing assets to her and Sarah. Ah Bao, defying his promise to keep the video secret, sends the touching video to Sarah's mother. Touched by his words, Sarah's mother hurriedly returns home and reconciles with her father after many years of estrangement.

It was shown in the film's closing credits that Sarah's grandfather flew to New York together with Sarah and her mother.

Cast
 Sarah Tan Qin Lin (of Kampilan films) as Sarah Lim Si Jia
 Ti Lung as Lim Chun Gen, Sarah's grandfather
 Jessica Hsuan as Sophia Lin, Sarah's mother
 Jayson Tan as Ah Bao, Sarah's friend
 Lenna Lim as Ivy

Themes
The director herself stated that The Kid from the Big Apple was about family values and wanted to convey the message of filial piety through the film. Specifically, she wanted to portray the importance of communication between grandparents and their grandchildren. The importance of father-daughter relationships is also conveyed in the film. Actress Sarah Tan said that "I think after watching this, you will think of home as well". For promoting family values, The Kid from the Big Apple won the Special Jury Awards at the 28th edition of the Malaysian Film Festival.

Teong also portrayed traditional Malaysian practices in this film as a reaction to her perception that the "actual (Malaysian traditional) culture and tradition is being forgotten and ignored, just for the sake of making profit". As such, the film was completely filmed in Malaysia and features traditional cultural practices, superstitions and dialects. However, the show was deliberately not "too Malaysian" as the director felt that the film had the potential for an overseas release.

Production
The Kid from the Big Apple is the directorial debut of Jess Teong, who had previously worked in the entertainment industry as a singer, model, actress and film producer at various stages in her career. The film was conceived because Teong felt angry about the rampant over-reliance of smartphones and over-commercialization of local cultural practices in Malaysia after returning to Malaysia from an overseas work stint. Thus, the script of the movie was partly influenced by its director's own childhood experience.

After almost 2 years of searching for a suitable child actress to portray Sarah, she met Qin Lin, and felt that she was perfectly suited for this role. This was because Qin Lin had both met Teong's criteria such as "not being too technical with her acting" and had the appropriate personality for the role. However, Teong had to spend 2 months training Qin Lin to prepare her for her bilingual role. The role is Qin Lin's first role in a full-length feature film. She had previously made her acting debut on Astro Xiao Tai Yang in 2014.

Most of the scenes in The Kid from the Big Apple were filmed at an apartment block in Taman Yulek, Cheras, Kuala Lumpur.

Release
The Kid from the Big Apple made its debut at the 7th Macau International Movie Festival in December 2015, where it won several film awards. The film made its cinematic debut in its home market of Malaysia and Singapore on 10 March 2016. It was subsequently released internationally in Taiwan and Hong Kong on 11 March 2016 and 21 April 2016 respectively.

Reception

Critical response
The film received mixed reviews by film critics. The South China Morning Post gave the film a score of 3 out of 5, stating that "this movie is really less interested in conflicts than it is the feel-good, and ultimately cathartic, reconciliation process" and described it as a "fish-out-of-water comedy". However, it did praise the "heartfelt performances by both Ti and Tan" and said that "this poignant family reunion movie will delight its less sceptical viewers.".

Mypaper was more positive, describing the film as "heartwarming". It also praised the acting of the child actors, and in particular, Sarah's acting, which it described as "on point" and "quite touching". Jeremy Cheong, who wrote for Malaysia's The Sun newspaper, liked the film's "really good pacing and a nice mix of comedy, a little bit of action and heart-tugging moments" and also praised the cast, whose "great chemistry" he credited for helping to "make each scene feel more believable". However, he took issue with "the blatant hard-selling of a certain sponsor's product" which he felt "could have been avoided".

Accolades

Sequel

A sequel, The Kid from the Big Apple 2, was released on 16 November 2017.

References

External links
 The Kid from the Big Apple on Facebook
 
  Official Trailer on YouTube

Malaysian drama films
2015 directorial debut films
2015 films
Chinese-language Malaysian films